Caledonia is a city and the county seat of Houston County, Minnesota, United States and is part of the La Crosse, Wisconsin Metropolitan Statistical Area. The population was 2,847 at the 2020 census.

History
Caledonia was platted in 1854–1855. The town was named by founder Col. Samuel McPhail for the ancient Roman word for Scotland. A post office has been in operation at Caledonia since 1855. Caledonia was incorporated in 1870, and was reincorporated in 1889.

Geography
Caledonia is located 17 miles southwest of La Crosse, Wisconsin.

Minnesota Highway 44 and Minnesota Highway 76 are two of the main routes in the community.

Climate

Demographics

2020 census
As of the census of 2020, the population was 2,847. The racial makeup of the city was 94.6% White, 1.2% Black or African American, 0.4% Asian, 0.3% Native American, 0.1% from other races, and 3.4% from two or more races. Ethnically, the population was 1.6% Hispanic or Latino of any race.

2010 census
As of the census of 2010, there were 2,868 people, 1,247 households, and 740 families living in the city. The racial makeup of the city was 96.8% White, 1.3% African American, 0.3% Native American, 0.7% Asian, 0.1% from other races, and 0.8% from two or more races. Hispanic or Latino of any race were 0.6% of the population.

There were 1,247 households, of which 27.4% had children under the age of 18 living with them, 43.5% were married couples living together, 11.5% had a female householder with no husband present, 4.4% had a male householder with no wife present, and 40.7% were non-families. 35.1% of all households were made up of individuals, and 16.4% had someone living alone who was 65 years of age or older. The average household size was 2.25 and the average family size was 2.91.

The median age in the city was 40.5 years. 22.7% of residents were under the age of 18; 9.4% were between the ages of 18 and 24; 23.3% were from 25 to 44; 24.2% were from 45 to 64; and 20.4% were 65 years of age or older. The gender makeup of the city was 48.9% male and 51.1% female.

2000 census
As of the census of 2000, there were 2,965 people, 1,223 households, and 754 families living in the city. The racial makeup of the city was 98.35% White, 0.40% African American, 0.17% Native American, 0.30% Asian, 0.03% from other races, and 0.74% from two or more races. Hispanic or Latino of any race were 0.54% of the population.

There were 1,223 households, out of which 30.7% had children under the age of 18 living with them, 49.1% were married couples living together, 9.8% had a female householder with no husband present, and 38.3% were non-families. 34.2% of all households were made up of individuals, and 17.7% had someone living alone who was 65 years of age or older. The average household size was 2.31 and the average family size was 3.00.

In the city, the population was spread out, with 25.6% under the age of 18, 7.3% from 18 to 24, 24.6% from 25 to 44, 20.6% from 45 to 64, and 21.9% who were 65 years of age or older. The median age was 40 years. For every 100 females, there were 88.0 males. For every 100 females age 18 and over, there were 84.4 males.

The median income for a household in the city was $32,455, and the median income for a family was $45,679. Males had a median income of $30,302 versus $20,091 for females. The per capita income for the city was $16,953. About 5.2% of families and 8.7% of the population were below the poverty line, including 7.8% of those under age 18 and 12.1% of those age 65 or over.

Education
Caledonia is home to Caledonia High School. St. Mary's Catholic School (K-8) and St. John's Lutheran School (Pre-K-8) are private schools.

Transportation
The Houston County Airport serves general aviation in the region.

See also
Caledonia Public Library

Notable people

William F. Dunbar, first Minnesota State Auditor.
Karl Klug, Defensive End for the Tennessee Titans
Dave Kunst, First Person to Walk Around the Earth
George Harold Lommen, Minnesota state legislator and lawyer
Maurice J. McCauley, Minnesota state representative
Ken Nelson, Country Music Hall of Fame member.
Isaac Fruechte, Wide Receiver for the Minnesota Vikings
Samuel A. Rask, Minnesota state senator and businessman

References

External links
City of Caledonia

Cities in Minnesota
Cities in Houston County, Minnesota
County seats in Minnesota